Jafet Misraim Arturo Camou Valenzuela (born July 25, 1990, in Hermosillo, Sonora) is a Mexican professional footballer who plays for Loros UdeC of Ascenso MX.

External links

1990 births
Living people
Sportspeople from Hermosillo
Footballers from Sonora
Club Atlético Zacatepec players
Murciélagos FC footballers
Loros UdeC footballers
Liga MX players
Association footballers not categorized by position
21st-century Mexican people
Mexican footballers